The European Bowling Tour (EBT) is a single tournament, with the top 16 men and top 16 women in the final standings of the European Bowling Tour being invited.

Information

Format 

The current format of the tournament is 3 qualification squads of 6 games each (one squad at short oil, one squad at long oil and one squad at mixed oil).  The top 8 bowlers in each division will then bowl an 8-game Round Robin (on mixed oil), and the winner of this round will be crowned the 2009 EBT Masters champion.

Prize money 

A prize pool of €36,000 will be provided (€18,000 for each gender) with last place in each division winning €300.  Additional prize money will be given to daily squad winners and the winner of qualification.

History

2008 

The Inaugural EBT Masters was held in the Rollhouse bowling centre in Ankara, Turkey.  The winners of the Event were Osku Palermaa of Finland and Kamilla Kjeldsen of Denmark.

The format for the tournament was 3 qualifying blocks of 8 games (totalling 24 games).  The 1st block was bowled on Short Oil, the 2nd on long oil and the 3rd of mixed oil (long oil on the left lane and short on the right lane of every pair of lanes).  The top 8 in each division after these 24 game then played a "best of 3" single elimination matchplay with the highest seed playing the lowest seed every round until the winner is decided.

Matchplay Results - Men

Matchplay Results - Women

External links
 European Bowling Masters Results since 2008 from European Tenpin Bowling Federation website
 Bowlingdigital.com, Tenpin news website
 Talktenpin.net, Tenpin news website
 Bowlinglinks all over the World, sorted by categories

Ten-pin bowling competitions